Ear Candy for the Headphone Trippers was Days Away's first release after they left Fueled By Ramen. It was released on October 10, 2007 with two bonus videos, "God and Mars (Acoustic)" and 	"I'm Sorry I Told You All My Problems."

Track listing 
(all songs written by Days Away)

 "Wish - 3:08
 "I'm Sorry I Told You All My Problems - 4:01
 "I'll Be Lost - 2:40
 "Being a Part of You - 2:54
 "Talk It Over - 4:11

Personnel 

Keith Goodwin - vocals, guitar
Bryan Gulla - keyboards, vocals
Chris Frangicetto - bass
Tim Arnold - drums, vocals
Jake Weiss - guitar

Days Away albums
2007 EPs